"Crown" (Korean: 어느 날 머리에서 뿔이 자랐다; RR: Eoneu nal meori-eseo ppuri jaratda,  "One day, a horn grew from my head") (stylized in all caps) is a song recorded by South Korean boy band TXT as the lead single from their debut Korean extended play (EP) The Dream Chapter: Star. It was released on March 4, 2019, through Big Hit Entertainment and Republic Records.

Background and release 
Tomorrow x Together (TXT) was announced in January 2019 to be debuting as Big Hit's first group since BTS. Big Hit began posting teasers on YouTube in late February.

Lyrics 
The lyrics of the song describe a boy that wakes up one day with horns on his head and begins to hate himself and withdraw from other people. He then meets another character, who has wings on their back, and learns to love himself. The band has described the song as being about the growing pains of puberty and adolescence.

Music video 
The video for the song was released on March 4, 2019, and was directed by Oui Kim. It surpassed 14.4 million views in the first 24 hours, setting the record for the shortest time among rookies who debuted that year. A choreography version of the video was released on March 18, 2019.

Reception 
The song was praised for its "fresh and energetic" sound and meaningful lyrics. Additionally, the group broke a record for the fastest act to reach first place on the Billboard World Digital Songs Chart.

Credits and personnel 
Credits adapted from Tidal.

 TXT primary vocals
 Slow Rabbit  production, songwriting
 "Hitman" Bang  songwriting
 Mayu Wakisaka  songwriting
 Melanie Joy Fontana  songwriting
 Michel "Lindgren" Schulz  songwriting
 Supreme Boi  songwriting
 Phil Tan  mix engineering 
 Bill Zimmerman  assistant mix engineering

Charts

Accolades

References 

2019 songs
K-pop songs
Songs written by Bang Si-hyuk
Hybe Corporation singles